The Southeastern Conference (SEC) Men's Basketball Rookie of the Year is an umbrella name for two awards given to the most outstanding basketball player in his first year at a Southeastern Conference school. One award, voted on and presented by SEC coaches, is currently called Freshman of the Year, and is open only to freshmen (i.e., those who are in their first season of college play, which is usually but not always their first year of college). The other award, presented by the Associated Press, is called Newcomer of the Year, and is open to any player in his first season at an SEC school, including those who transferred to SEC schools. (The coaches' award was not always restricted to freshmen, but now is.)

Key

Winners

Winners by school

Footnotes 
Award is given to either a freshman or player in first season within the league.
SEC Media guide provides the entire list on page 128

References 

Rookies
NCAA Division I men's basketball conference rookies of the year